The Canadian Society for Pharmaceutical Sciences (CSPS) is a scientific society founded in 1997 by Fakhreddin Jamali of Alberta University with the aim of promoting the growth of pharmacological research and establishing a network of pharmaceutical scientists in Canada. It publishes the Journal of Pharmacy and Pharmaceutical Sciences.

See also
American Society for Pharmacology and Experimental Therapeutics

References

External links
 

Learned societies of Canada
Biology societies
Organizations established in 1997
1997 establishments in Canada
Pharmacological societies